The 2015–16 Liga II was the 76th season of the Liga II, the second tier of the Romanian football league system.  The season began on  29 August.

The 28 teams were divided in two series (with 14 teams each). The regular season was played in a round-robin tournament. The first six teams from each series played a play-off for promotion to Liga I. Because of switching to a system with just one series of 22 teams from next season, there will be 11 teams relegated from Liga II this year. After the regular season, the last two teams in each series relegated to Liga III; the last 3 teams in each play-out pool also relegated, while the 3rd placed teams in the play-out faced off in a game that determined the 11th relegated team.

Team changes
At the end of 2014-15 season, Voluntari from Seria I and Poli Timișoara from Seria II were promoted to Liga I. Four teams were relegated to Liga III: Unirea Slobozia and Săgeata Năvodari (Seria I), Olt Slatina and Fortuna Poiana Câmpina (Seria II).Last six teams from 2014–15 Liga I were relegated to Liga II: Gaz Metan Mediaș, Brașov, Universitatea Cluj, Rapid București, Oțelul Galați, Ceahlăul Piatra Neamț.The winners of the five 2014–15 Liga III series were promoted to Liga II:  Bucovina Pojorâta, Dunărea Călărași, Chindia Târgoviște, UTA Arad and Baia Mare.

Renamed teams

Academica Argeș was moved back to Clinceni and renamed Academica Clinceni.
CF Brăila was renamed Dacia Unirea Brăila.

Seria I

Stadia by capacity and locations

Personnel and kits

Note: Flags indicate national team as has been defined under FIFA eligibility rules. Players and Managers may hold more than one non-FIFA nationality.

Managerial changes

Seria II

Stadia by capacity and locations

Personnel and kits

Note: Flags indicate national team as has been defined under FIFA eligibility rules. Players and Managers may hold more than one non-FIFA nationality.

Managerial changes

League tables

Seria I

Seria II

Promotion play-offs

At the end of the regular season, the first six teams from each series will play a Promotion play-off. The winners will be promoted to Liga I and the second place from both series will play a Play-Off match. The winner will play against 12th place in Liga I, and the winner of this second match will play in Liga I. The teams will start the play-off with half of the number of points gained in the regular season, after the results with the last two teams are canceled.

Seria I

Seria II

Relegation play-outs
At the end of the regular season, the teams that are on 13th and 14th places will be relegated to Liga III. The teams from 7th place to 12th place will play a relegation play-out. At the end of the play-out, the last 3 teams in both series relegate directly, while the team that finishes on 3rd place from Seria I will play a Play-Out match with the 3rd place from Seria II, the loser of which will also relegate to Liga III. The teams will start the play-out with half of the number of points gained in the regular season, after the results with the last two teams are canceled.

Seria I

Seria II

Liga I play-offs
The 12th-placed team of the Liga I faced the winner of the match between the 2nd-placed teams of Seria I and Seria II.

First round

Second round

Notes:
 Voluntari qualified for 2016–17 Liga I and UTA Arad qualified for 2016–17 Liga II.

Liga II play-out
The 9th-placed team of the Seria I faced 9th-placed team of Seria II.

Notes:
 Gloria Buzău withdrew from the relegation play-out and the matches were homologated with 0–3. Gloria Buzău relegated to Liga III.

References

2015-16
Rom
2